Jeep train usually refers to a railway train hauled by jeeps fitted with railway wagon wheels instead of normal road wheels. World War II jeeps were converted from road vehicles into steel-wheeled rail switchers, shunters, light locomotives, speeders or draisines.  (The phrase was also used for supply trains consisting of jeeps and for columns of jeeps linked together and pulled through bad ground by tractors.  Not all primary sources will use this phrase in the same way.)

History

U.S.A. 

Adapting automobiles as gasoline railcars is recorded as early as 1912 and early publicity on Jeeps mentioned their potential use as an inspection car. The USAAF in Australia used flanged-wheel jeeps as switchers in 1943, which led to testing as road-switchers for future operations in New Guinea. Perhaps the first large-scale use of jeep as locomotive was in the CBI theatre.  Eleven days after the Normandy landing, jeep speeders were in use on the continent, surveying lines for use or repair.
Postwar, jeep speeders were used as inspection cars, and jeep trains used for light service, including recreation.  The Jeep train at Lewis and Clark Caverns
claimed to be the shortest jeep railway. Over time, hi-rail vehicles pushed dedicated speeders out of railroads; civilian jeeps were often used.

Australia 
In Borneo in 1945, Australian soldiers converted jeeps to run on rails in order to compensate for the lack of locomotives on a narrow gauge railway line.

United Kingdom 
The United Kingdom used railworthy Jeeps during World War II especially in France, Germany, and Burma. Jeep trains were used extensively during the Malayan Emergency.

France 
French forces used rail jeeps – "jeep draisines" – including armoured rail jeeps, in Indochina, and later in the Algerian war.

Loads and speeds 
A jeep, designed to draw  on the road, could pull much greater loads on rails thanks to the lower rolling resistance of rail vehicles. During Australian military operations in Borneo, jeeps hauled goods wagons with a payload of four tons of sand.

Military use

See also 
 Road–rail vehicle

References

External links 
 

Jeep
Military light utility vehicles
Rail and road vehicle